The 2004–05 Southern Illinois Salukis men's basketball team represented Southern Illinois University Carbondale during the 2004–05 NCAA Division I men's basketball season. The Salukis were led by first-year head coach Chris Lowery and played their home games at the SIU Arena in Carbondale, Illinois as members of the Missouri Valley Conference. They finished the season 27–8, 15–3 in MVC play to finish atop the regular season standings. The Salukis were eliminated in the semifinal round of the MVC tournament, but received an at-large bid to the NCAA tournament as No. 7 seed in the Chicago region. The Salukis defeated No. 10 seed Saint Mary's before falling to No. 2 seed Oklahoma State in the round of 32.

Roster

Schedule and results

|-
!colspan=12 style=| Regular season

|-
!colspan=12 style=| Missouri Valley tournament

|-
!colspan=12 style=| NCAA tournament

Rankings

Awards and honors
Darren Brooks – MVC Player of the Year (second time)
Chris Lowery – MVC Coach of the Year (third straight season a different Saluki head coach received the honor – Bruce Weber and Matt Painter)

References

2001-02
2004–05 Missouri Valley Conference men's basketball season
Southern Illinois
2004 in sports in Illinois
2005 in sports in Illinois